Nicholas I of Ohrid (Greek: Νικόλαος Α΄ Οχρίδας; Bulgarian, Macedonian and Serbian: Никола I Охридски) was Eastern Orthodox Archbishop of Ohrid, from c. 1340 to c. 1350.  

In 1334, the Archbishopric of Ohrid came under Serbian rule, preserving its ecclesiastical autonomy. On Easter Day, 16 April 1346, the Serbian King Stefan Dušan convoked the state assembly in Skopje, attended by the Serbian Archbishop Joanikije II, Archbishop Nikolas I of Ohrid, the Bulgarian Patriarch Simeon and various religious leaders of Mount Athos. On that occasion, Serbian Archbishopric of Peć was raised to the status of a Patriarchate. The Archbishopric of Ohrid was not annexed to the Serbian Patriarchate of Peć and kept its autonomy, recognizing only the honorary seniority of the Serbian Patriarch.

References

Sources
 
 

14th-century deaths
14th-century Eastern Orthodox bishops
Archbishops of Ohrid
People of the Serbian Empire
Year of birth missing